Phú Tân may refer to several places in Vietnam, including:

Phú Tân District, An Giang Province
Phú Tân District, Cà Mau Province
Phú Tân, Bến Tre, a ward of Bến Tre City
Phú Tân, Bình Dương, a ward of Thủ Dầu Một
Phú Tân, Hậu Giang, a commune of Châu Thành District, Hậu Giang Province
Phú Tân, Sóc Trăng, a commune of Châu Thành District, Sóc Trăng Province
Phú Tân, Đồng Nai, a commune of Định Quán District
Phú Tân (commune in Cà Mau Province), a commune of Phú Tân District
Phú Tân, Tiền Giang, a commune of Tân Phú Đông District

See also
Tân Phú (disambiguation)